National Commodity & Derivatives Exchange Limited (NCDEX) is an Indian online commodity and derivative exchange based in India. It is under the ownership of Ministry of Finance, Government of India. It has an independent board of directors and provides a commodity exchange platform for market participants to trade in commodity derivatives. It is a government  company, incorporated on 23 April 2003 under the Companies Act, 1956 and obtained its Certificate for Commencement of Business on 9 May 2003. It commenced operations on 15 December 2003.

As of 31 July 2013, NCDEX has 848 registered members and client base of about 20 Lakhs and offers trading on more than 49,000 terminals across 1,000 centers in India. It facilitates deliveries of commodities through a network of over 594 accredited warehouses through eight warehouse service providers, with holding capacity of around 1.5 million tonnes and offers average deliveries of 1 lakh MT at every contract expiry. NCDEX has offices in Mumbai, Delhi, Ahmedabad, Indore, Hyderabad, Jaipur, and Kolkata.

Shareholder consortium 
 Jaypee Capital Services Limited

References

Financial services companies established in 2003
Commodity exchanges in India
Companies based in Mumbai
Futures exchanges
2003 establishments in Maharashtra
Companies established in 2003
https://economictimes.indiatimes.com/markets/stocks/news/arun-raste-named-new-md-ceo-of-ncdex/articleshow/82242405.cms